Chaindance is a 1991 Canadian drama film. The film stars Michael Ironside, Brad Dourif, Rae Dawn Chong, and Don S. Davis as "Sergeant".

Background 
The film is based on Alan Aylward's work with physically disabled children as a recreational therapist at a residential chronic care centre in Toronto from 1974 to 1980.  The original script suggested Nick Nolte as Blake  and John Hurt as Johnnie, but both passed on the roles which went to Michael Ironside and Brad Dourif, respectively.  Hurt, who had previously worked with Aylward during a documentary series The Disability Myth, was initially interested in the role of Johnnie; Nolte's agent reportedly required a few million dollars for a retainer which Aylward was unable to raise. Ironside was on set with Nick Nolte and Powers Boothe in New Mexico making a film called Extreme Prejudice when he was presented a draft of the script for Chaindance by his Toronto agent, Lori Rotenberg.  Ironside had just finished reading the script when Nolte emerged from his trailer to announce that he had just secured the rights to produce Weeds, based on the book by the same name, and also "a prison story".  Inspired by what he interpreted as serendipity, Ironside optioned the script from Aylward in 1987/88, began production in Vancouver, and released the film in 1991.  A few years later, the British Columbia Corrections Ministry started a program between prisoners and institutionalized handicapped patients based on the fictitious rehabilitation program in Chaindance.

Recognition 
 1991
 Genie Award for Best Achievement in Art Direction/Production Design - Phil Schmidt - Nominated
 Genie Award for Best Achievement in Editing - Allan Lee - Nominated
 Genie Award for Best Motion Picture - Richard Davis - Nominated
 Genie Award for Best Performance by an Actor in a Leading Role - Brad Dourif - Nominated

References

External links 
 Yahoo! Movies plot summary
 

1991 films
Canadian drama films
1991 drama films
English-language Canadian films
Films shot in Vancouver
Films directed by Allan A. Goldstein
1990s Canadian films